The 2013 Copa San Juan Gobierno was a professional tennis tournament played on clay courts. It was the second edition of the tournament which was part of the 2013 ATP Challenger Tour. It took place in San Juan, Argentina between 7 and 13 October 2013.

Singles main draw entrants

Seeds

 1 Rankings are as of September 30, 2013.

Other entrants
The following players received wildcards into the singles main draw:
  Facundo Alvo
  Pedro Cachín
  Tomás Lipovšek Puches
  Mateo Nicolás Martínez

The following players used protected ranking to get into the singles main draw:
  Laurent Rochette

The following players received entry from the qualifying draw:
  Francisco Bahamonde
  Gabriel Hidalgo
  Joaquin Monteferrario
  Gonzalo Villanueva

Champions

Singles

 Guido Andreozzi def.  Diego Schwartzman 6–7(5–7), 7–6(7–4), 6–0

Doubles

 Guillermo Durán /  Máximo González def.  Martín Alund /  Facundo Bagnis 6–3, 6–0

External links
Official Website

Copa San Juan Gobierno
Copa San Juan Gobierno
Copa San Juan Gobierno
Copa San Juan Gobierno